Difatha is a settlement in Kirinyaga County, Kenya.

References 

Populated places in Central Province (Kenya)
Kirinyaga County